The Lakes National Park is a national park in the East Gippsland region of Victoria, Australia.

Location and features
The  park is set on the east shore of the Gippsland Lakes, fringed by the waters of Lake Victoria and Lake Reeve. The park includes Sperm Whale Head peninsula and Rotamah and Little Rotamah Islands. The park is managed by Parks Victoria jointly with the Gunaikurnai traditional owners.

Rotamah Island and Little Rotamah Island were added to the park in 1978.

See also

 Gippsland Lakes Coastal Park
 Protected areas of Victoria

References

External links

 The Lakes National Park webpage at Parks Victoria website.
 

National parks of Victoria (Australia)
Protected areas established in 1927
1927 establishments in Australia
East Gippsland